Samantha Casella (born in Faenza, Italy on 1 October 1981) is an Italian director and screenwriter.

Samantha Casella is a film director who investigates the dark side which resides in the hearts and minds of her characters. Her style leads to a journey through the unconscious, where the atmospheres recall a pictorial universe full of mystery and darkness.

Biography 
Samantha Casella studied screenwriting and narrative techniques at the Holden School in Turin and cinema directing at the Scuola Immagina in Florence.

Her director essay, the short film “Juliette” has participated in various festivals, winning 19 awards, including two awards at the “Massimo Troisi European Award”.

She continued her path by directing some short films including “Silenzi Interrotti”, “Iris” with Elisabetta Rocchetti and “Ágape” with Marina Rocco and Paolo Stella; which have won at international festivals.

Later she directed “Giro di giostra”, a medium-length film presented during the Mostra Internazionale d’arte Cinematografica in Venice, the Venice Film Meeting section.

In the documentary sector her most important works are: "Mediterraneo", centered on the sculptor Giuseppe Spagnulo and presented at the Venice Biennale; “The West according to Civitelli”, on the cartoonist of Tex Willer; “Via Crucis al Pantheon” which proposes the manufacturing processes of the Via Crucis installed at the Pantheon in Rome and “Self-portrait with Pope”, testimony of a painting by Gianni Bubani and a poem by Davide Rondoni donated to Pope Benedict XVI.

In 2019 she directed "I Am Banksy" with Marco Iannitello. At its debut in the TCL Chinese Theater in Los Angeles at the Golden State Film Festival, it won Best International Short. It also won Best Foreign Short at the Los Angeles Independent Film Festival Award and Best International Short at the Los Angeles Theatrical Release Competition & Award. In total, the short film collected 15 awards, including Best Director at the Accolade Global Film Competition.

In 2020 she directed the short film "To A God Unknown", distributed in the United States by FourWalled and it won 228 awards at international festivals organized in 35 different countries, including the Independent Short Award, the Metropolitan Film Festival NYC, the Toronto Short Film Channel Festival, the International Motion Picture Critics Awards, the Royal Society of Motion Picture Award, the Hollywood Gold Awards, the Star Hollywood Awards and the Global Film Competition.

In 2022 she made her first feature film: Santa Guerra starring Eugenia Costantini. In the cast, in addition to Samantha Casella, Ekaterina Buscemi, Emma Quartullo and Maria Grazia Cucinotta also star in the film.

Santa Guerra premiered on 7 September 2022 in a special event during the 79th Venice International Film Festival. In that event, "Santa Guerra" won two special awards: the Tangoo Award for Cinema and the Italian Film Festival Award.

Filmography

Short films 

 Juliette (2001)
 Frozen (2002)
 Non chiudere gli occhi (2002)
 Memorie da un’isola di morti (2003)
 Silenzi Interrotti (2004)
 Iris (2005)
 L’opportunità (2008)
 Dies Irae (2009)
 Ágape (2010)
 I Am Banksy (2019)
 To a God Unknown - Al Dio sconosciuto  (2020)

Medium-length films 

 Giro di giostra (2006)

Full-length films 

 Santa Guerra (Holy War) (2022)

Documentaries 

 Mediterraneo (2001)
 Saison Russe (2003)
 Il West secondo Civitelli (2007)
 Incontri Jazz (2008)
 Dai secoli del fuoco e del disegno (2009)
 Solida Imago (2010)
 Diario per Immagini (2010)
 In Illo Tempore (2011)
 Coincidentia Oppositorum (2011)
 Via Crucis al Pantheon (2012)
 Autoritratto con Papa (2012)
 TraDizioni (2013)
 Passione, Meditazione sul Cristo (2014)

Videoclips 

 Boy Down di Strippop (2008)
 Nero Deserto di Santo Barbaro (2009)

Video Art 

 Ascesi (2015)
 SK27 Bright Star (2016)

Notes

External links 

1981 births
Living people
Italian women film directors
Italian women screenwriters